Batswana nationality law is regulated by the 1966 Constitution of Botswana, as amended; the Citizenship Act 1998, and its revisions; and international agreements entered into by the government of Botswana. These laws determine who is, or is eligible to be, a national of Botswana. The legal means to acquire nationality, formal legal membership in a nation, differ from the domestic relationship of rights and obligations between a national and the nation, known as citizenship. The Botswana nationality is typically obtained on the principle of jus sanguinis, i.e. by birth to parents with Botswana nationality. It can be granted to persons who have lived in the country for a specific period of time, who have performed distinguished service to the nation or who have an affiliation to the country through naturalisation.

Acquiring Botswana nationality

Nationality in Botswana is acquired at birth or later in life by naturalisation.

By birth

Persons born anywhere to at least one parent who is a national of Botswana.

By naturalisation
Regular naturalisation in Botswana is acquired by submitting an application to the Minister responsible for the administration of immigration. Applicants must provide evidence that they are of good character; have familiarity with Setswana or another tribal language of the country; intend to live in Botswana; and have resided within the territory for a cumulative period of ten years, and without break for the year immediately preceding an application for naturalisation. Besides foreigners, persons who may attain nationality by naturalisation include:

 The spouse of a Motswana (Botswana national), provided they have resided in the country for five years;
 Angolan refugees under a tripartite agreement between the two nations and the United Nations High Commissioner for Refugees, who do not wish to repatriate to Angola;
 Minor children of persons who have become naturalised Batswana;
 Adoptees, upon completion of an adoption order; or
 Persons who have performed distinguished service to the country, at the discretion of the President without requirements.

Loss of nationality
Batswana nationals may renounce their nationality provided they have legal majority and capacity and have obtained other nationality. Article 5 of the African Charter on Human and Peoples' Rights forbids revoking nationality without a fair trial and due process. In the case Modise v. Botswana (2000) the African Human Rights Commission found against Botswana and cautioned that failure to recognise a person's legal status and attempts to denationalise individuals violates the charter, causing personal harm. Denaturalisation may occur if a persons holds dual nationality that does not meet specified exceptions; if a person obtained nationality through fraud, false representation, or concealment; if they have committed crimes against the state; if they have committed certain acts deemed disloyal; or if they no longer reside in the country.

Dual nationality
Botswana does not allow dual nationality except in the case of a minor who must declare a choice upon reaching majority, or in the case that foreign nationality is automatically acquired by marriage.

History

Tswana chiefdoms (1700–1884)
The Ngwaketse chiefdom was founded around 1700 by migrants of the Hurutshe and Kwena clans who settled among the Khalagari and Rolong peoples in the southeastern portion of what would become Botswana. Population growth and competition over control of trade routes caused warfare and fractures in the Phofu chiefdom of their traditional home in the western Transvaal region, leading to their migration. By 1750 the Ngwaketse chiefdom was a powerful and militaristic state in control of copper production, cattle raiding, and hunting near present day Kanye. Another group of Kwena migrants settled near Molepolole, as did a group which established the Ngwato chiefdoms in the north of the territory around Shoshong, which expanded west across the Kalahari Desert. By 1770, a group broke off from the Ngwato and established the Tawana chiefdom near Lake Ngami. These groups established trade routes from Angola to the Cape Colony to Mozambique, which led to raids to acquire cattle, furs, ivory, slaves, and other goods. From the turn of the nineteenth century a period, known as the Difaqane, of forced migration, conflict and drought created instability for the inhabitants of southern Africa.

In 1824, the Ngwaketse chiefdom was attacked by a large group of Kololo refugees, who had been pushed north from Maputo Bay. Moving north, the Kololo continued into Ngwato territory before finally settling in what is now known as Zambia in 1835. In 1828, Ndebele people from the Zulu Kingdom attacked the Ngwaketse and Tawana chieftains, forcing them into vassalage. The Ndebele were later expelled to an area of modern Zimbabwe by the Boers, but continued to be a threat to the chiefdoms in the territory. The Tswana chiefdoms regained control over their trade routes and territory in the 1840s. The Tswana states of the Ngwaketse, Kwena, Ngwato and Tawana organised their subjects into wards under local chiefs who paid tribute to the head chief. The head chief was expected to maintain stability through legislation, decision-making and allocation of resources. He also had the authority to demand labour to complete projects of value to the community. Wards each contained a Kgotla, a community council, which governed policy as well as judicial matters for a village. Women were forbidden to participate in the council, and were unable to seek recourse before it. Villages were linked by tribal affiliations and kinship networks of households. Households in Tswana society were patriarchal and at the center of the social, economic, and political structures. Paternal kinship formed the basis for determining inheritance of wealth, typically land and cattle, and wealth determined socio-political influence and power within the community. Women held subservient positions socially and under the law and wives and children were legally dependent on the head of the clan or household.

The four Tswana states built trade ties and roads, allowing missionaries of the London Missionary Society to establish stations within their territories between 1844 and 1877. From 1852, Boers began raiding in Kwena and Ngwato territories, and in 1870 attempted to establish farms in Ngwaketse territory. The Boers were repelled and eventually gave up their expansionist policies, formally recognizing territorial sovereignty of the chiefs for a decade. Then in the 1880s, they renewed their aims of acquiring Tswana territory. Alarmed by Boer expansion and the growth of German influence in South West Africa, British missionaries and commercial entities aligned with the Tswana chiefdoms. When the Boers invaded British territory and established Stellaland and the State of Goshen, declaring a protectorate over the area in 1882, the reluctant British decided to act.

British protectorate (1884–1966)
In 1884, in response to a request for assistance by inhabitants in the territory of the Tswana people, and to protect their own interests from Boer, German, and Portuguese encroachment, the British crown established the Bechuanaland Protectorate for the area north of the Molopo River. The territory south of the river became a crown colony, British Bechuanaland, which was merged into the Cape Colony in 1895. When British protectorates were established in 1815, there was little difference between the rights of British subjects and protected persons. By 1914, British protectorates were considered to be foreign territories lacking an internal government. When Britain extended this status over a territory, it took responsibility for both internal and external administration, including defence and foreign relations. Indigenous persons who were born in a protectorate were known as British Protected Persons (BPP) and were not entitled to be British nationals. BPPs had no right of return to the United Kingdom and were unable to exercise rights of citizenship; however, they could be issued a passport and could access diplomatic services when travelling abroad. Persons born in a British protectorate to a father who was a British national derived their nationality from their parent.

British subjects living in the Bechuanaland Protectorate (1884–1966)
In 1911, at the Imperial Conference a decision was made to draft a common nationality code for use across the British Empire. The British Nationality and Status of Aliens Act 1914 allowed local jurisdictions in the self-governing Dominions to continue regulating nationality in their territories, but also established an imperial nationality scheme for use throughout the realm. The uniform law, which went into effect on 1 January 1915, required a married woman to derive her nationality from her spouse, meaning if he was British, she was also, and if he was foreign, so was she. It stipulated that upon loss of nationality of a husband, a wife could declare that she wished to remain British. It also provided that if a marriage had terminated, through death or divorce, a British-born national who had lost her status through marriage could reacquire British nationality through naturalisation without meeting a residency requirement. The statute reiterated common law provisions for natural-born persons born within the realm on or after the effective date. By using the word person, the statute nullified legitimacy requirements for jus soli nationals, meaning an illegitimate child could derive nationality from its mother. For those born abroad on or after the effective date, legitimacy was still required, and could only be derived by a child from a British father (one generation), who was natural-born or naturalised. Naturalisations required five years residence or service to the crown.

Amendments to the British Nationality Act were enacted in 1918, 1922, 1933 and 1943 changing derivative nationality by descent and modifying slightly provisions for women to lose their nationality upon marriage. Because of a rise in statelessness, a woman who did not automatically acquire her husband's nationality upon marriage or upon his naturalisation in another country, did not lose their British status after 1933. The 1943 revision allowed a child born abroad at any time to be a British national by descent if the Secretary of State agreed to register the birth. Under the terms of the British Nationality Act 1948, British nationals in the Bechuanaland Protectorate were reclassified at that time as "Citizens of the UK and Colonies" (CUKC). The basic British nationality scheme did not change overmuch, and typically those who were previously defined as British remained the same. Changes included that wives and children no longer automatically acquired the status of the husband or father, children who acquired nationality by descent no longer were required to make a retention declaration, and registrations for children born abroad were extended.

British protected persons living in the Bechuanaland Protectorate (1885–1966)
In 1914, the Alien Restriction Act clarified that while BPPs were not nationals, neither were they aliens. When the law was amended in 1919, that provision remained the same, meaning that BPPs could not naturalise. Until 1934, when the British Protected Persons Order was drafted, the status of BPP was not statutory, but rather granted at the prerogative of the monarch. Under the 1934 Order, Belonger status with regard to protected territories was defined to mean persons born before or after the Order in a protectorate who possessed no nationality and were not a British subject, or persons born abroad to a native of a protectorate who were stateless and not British subjects. The statute extended BPP status to children and wives of BPPs, if they were stateless, and specifically provided that if a woman married someone who was a national of another nation, she lost her BPP status. In 1943, the British Nationality Act clarified that BPPs born abroad in territories that were within the crown's dominions were British subjects by virtue of jus soli, but those born within a protectorate were not subjects.

Under the terms of the British Nationality Act 1948, BPPs of the Bechuanaland Protectorate status did not change. However, the Act, while retaining the provisions that BPPs were not aliens and could not naturalise, allowed BPPs to register as BPP of a protected place or as a British subject under certain conditions. In 1949, the British Protectorates, Protected States and Protected Persons Order in Council repealed former orders about BPPs and detailed provisions for conferring protected status. It provided that protected persons were BPPs of a protectorate if they were born there; if they were born abroad to a father who was a native of a protectorate; or if at the time of their birth their father was a BPP. It also allowed women married to BPPs to register as a BPP and allowed certain nationals of foreign countries to register as BPPs. Minor changes to protected persons' status were made by Orders of Council in 1952, 1953, 1958, 1960, 1961, and 1962, but major changes did not occur until 1965. 

Under the 1965 Order, the provisions of the 1949 order were retained, but new provisions for BPPs at birth included as BPPS, persons who would, except for the death of their father, have become BPPs; persons born aboard a ship or aircraft registered in a protectorate or unregistered but owned by the government of a protectorate; and foundlings discovered in a protectorate. In addition, stateless persons born prior to 28 January 1949 were allowed to register as BPPs if either of their parents were, or would have been except for death, BPPs on that date. Stateless persons born after that date could register if their parents were BPPs at the time of the child's birth. The Bechuanaland Protectorate terminated on 30 September 1966, when the Republic of Botswana became an independent nation.

Post-independence (1966–present)
When Botswana gained its independence, it restricted conference of nationality to those persons who had been BPPs or CUKCs and were either born in the Bechuanaland Protectorate or whose father had been born there. Persons who had been protected persons but were not born within its territory were not granted nationality by Botswana, but were allowed to apply for naturalisation if they had lived in the territory for a minimum of five years. If they were born in a place or naturalised in a place that remained part of the United Kingdom and its colonies, persons not born in Botswana could retain their status as CUKCs. Wives' status was dependent upon the status of their husband, thus if her husband lost his CUKCs status, she did as well. If a husband became a Motswana, or would have except for death, his wife was allowed to register as a national. Those born after 30 September 1966, automatically acquired nationality if born to a Motswana father. Subsequently, Botswana enacted the Citizenship of Botswana Supplementary Provisions Act in 1966, which was completely rewritten in 1982.

The Citizenship Act of 1982 provided that any child born in Botswana became a national, unless at the time of birth, it acquired nationality elsewhere through descent from its father. It allowed only illegitimate children to derive nationality from a mother if she was a native-born Motswana, but for derivation of nationality from a father, the requirement was only that he be a national. It had no provisions for a wife to facilitate the naturalisation of her foreign spouse; however, foreign wives were allowed to naturalise after a residency period of two and a half years. To comply with international agreements like the Convention on the Nationality of Married Women and the Convention on the Elimination of All Forms of Discrimination Against Women, it did not require that women acquire a husband's nationality upon marriage.

Though the Act of 1982 provided for any child born in Botswana to become a national, Botswana ended its provision for jus soli in 1984. Other provisions remained the same reiterating that legitimate children born anywhere could obtain the nationality of their Motswana father; only illegitimate children could obtain their mother's status; and while a foreign wife could be naturalised under preferential terms if married to a Motswana husband, the same did not hold true for a foreign husband of Motswana  wife. In 1992, Unity Dow successfully challenged the law, sparking women to press for changes to nationality laws across Africa. A new Citizenship Act was enacted in 1995, eliminating the gender discrepancies in the prior legislation. In 2021, Sithabile Pauline Mathe, instituted a legal challenge to Botswana's prohibition of dual nationality. Mathe claimed that the Citizenship Act of 1998 was discriminatory as it required her children to choose between their father's and mother's heritage and swear an oath of allegiance which was not required of other nationals considered Batswana by birth.

Notes

References

Citations

Bibliography

 

 Though self-published, Parsons is a history professor at the University of Botswana and has published books, articles, and textbooks through traditional publishing media.

 
 

Nationality law
Law of Botswana